Ivan D'Angelo is an Italian professional footballer who plays as a midfielder.  He is currently without a club following his release from Dunfermline Athletic.

Career
Born in San Benedetto del Tronto, D'Angelo has played for Ascoli, Sambenedettese and Dunfermline Athletic.

References

1990s births
Living people
Italian footballers
Dunfermline Athletic F.C. players
Scottish Football League players
Association football midfielders